Parqués is the Colombian version of a board game in the cross and circle family (the category that includes Pachisi). The game is described as a "random thinking" game: the moves depend on the roll of the dice but players must consider possible strategies before executing their move. The objective of the game is to advance all the pieces to the end. Once in the safety zone player can use 2 dice until they are one space away from home, where they will then just use one die.

Colombian culture 

Parqués is the Colombian version of Parcheesi, which itself is a version of Pachisi (which originated in India). The
meaning of the word may be a translation of the pachisi word, also influenced by similar games such as Parcheesi. Parqués as a word in another context has no meaning.
Although it could be argued that the game's origin is Spanish (from Parchís) due to the similarity between both games, there is wide agreement in Colombia that the game is completely Colombian. Parqués stems directly from Pachisi in the same way as Parcheesi, Parchís or Ludo. There is no proof to the claim that it stems from a country other than India, up to date. Moreover, no Parqués game is played in any other Latin American countries. Parqués is a mixture of the original Indian game and the influences of local Colombian culture.

In Colombia, people from all parts of the country play the game and there are local variations of it. It is very popular; played by both children and adults. Adults usually play the game by betting money on the first piece, on capturing pieces, or on winning the game, to make gameplay more interesting. There are boards for 4, 6 and 8 players. The boards usually contain pictures of soccer teams, singers, actors, or other cultural figures on the jail boxes. Also, most boards are made by fans of the game, by drawing and framing them.

The board itself is usually placed on a box covered by glass. The use of glass is to allow dice to be thrown more easily. There are versions of the board that are made of paper to make it portable.

Gameplay

Parqués is played with two dice; two to eight players can compete in the same match, depending on what type of game board is used. Each player is given four pieces and uses a specific color. That color is useful to identify the pieces, the jails and the arrival squares of each player. The most common colors are red, blue, yellow and green, usually arranged in that order. The game can also be played with fewer than four pieces.

The jail box is where the pieces are placed at the beginning of the match and it is where they go whenever an opponent "captures" them. The player throws the dice three times and attempts to get a pair in order to "free" the pieces.

Once the pieces are freed, they are placed in a special box next to the jail. This box is called "Home", or "Salida" (literally, "exit" in Spanish. It means it is the place where the pieces exit or get out from the jail).

If a player does not roll any pairs during his turn, the dice are passed to the player on the right. Otherwise, the first player frees the pieces and wins an extra turn to move them. The player throws again and must move the points of the dice with either 1 or 2 pieces.

For example:

The player rolls 5-3
The player can move 8 squares forward with one piece          or
The player can move 5 squares with one piece and 3 with another

If some points cannot be used, they are forfeited. After the player makes a move, the turn must be passed to the player on the right (anti-clockwise)

The pieces cannot advance backwards, and they cannot be in any of the four boxes before their "Home" box.

Throws and turns
Each player can throw the dice once. There are some exceptions to this rule:

If the player has all his pieces in jail, he can throw up to three times until he frees them with a pair. If doubles are not rolled during the three tries, he passes the turn.
If the player throws a pair during any turn, he wins an extra turn.
If the player throws three consecutive doubles, he is rewarded by moving any piece of his/her to the goal. If the die hits a chest piece the person who rolled has to roll again

Capturing pieces
The player can capture an opponent's piece by placing his own piece on the same box as the other player's piece. However, he cannot capture a piece that is on a safe or a home box. Capturing in Colombia is called "eating" ("comer" in Spanish). The captured piece is sent to the player's jail (nest).

However, the player can capture pieces on his home box. When he frees any piece from jail, the pieces placed on his home are captured, that is, sent to its jail, losing all their advances.

When a player avoids capturing a piece, it usually happens by mistake. On that case, an opponent must point the mistake out to all the players. The piece that did not capture its opponent must go to jail. Capturing opponents is mandatory and therefore takes priority above any other possible plays including the chance to leave jail.

Special boxes 
There are three types of special boxes.

 Home: (Salida) where the pieces are placed when freed.
 Safe: (Seguro) the pieces cannot be captured on this box
 Arrival: (Llegada) a player must move his pieces through nine final boxes to try to  win the game. These boxes are usually the same color as that player's pieces. The ninth box is the last box in the game for each person. If a piece reaches that box, it is removed from the game. When all of a player's pieces are out of the game, the player wins.

Variations
Vuelta obligada (mandatory restart): If the player has its piece near the end and he gets the exact value to capture a piece in the four boxes before his HOME box, he must capture it and move that piece from there in subsequent moves, losing all the advance of the piece.
Cielo robado (stolen heaven): if the player gets the exact value to capture a piece on alien arrival boxes, he can win the game from there, as if they were his own arrival point.
De piedra en piedra (from stone to stone): the player can only move its pieces on the safe and home boxes. Thus, he can only move when the dice values are exactly 7, 5, 10 or 12, depending on the position of his pieces. Capturing can only be done in SAFE boxes, never on home.
Con Policía (With Policeman): An additional piece is placed on each safe and players are able to capture pieces by moving this "policeman" to the position required. If a player fails to realize the move, his most advanced piece is sent to jail. Sometimes, to make things more interesting, the policeman is allowed to move backwards also.

Comparison to similar games

Parcheesi
Parcheesi is also played with 2 dice it has the same goal: be the first to advance all the pieces to the end.
Parqués has 8 safe boxes and 96 in total; Parcheesi has 16 and 68, respectively.
In Parcheesi, doublets (pairs) also have the same special purpose (getting an extra turn).
Capturing is done the same way.
In Parcheesi, 5 has a special meaning, allowing to get pieces out of the nest. It is different from Parqués, where 5 is a regular value.
It is not possible more than 2 pawns in the same square; Parqués has no restriction of this type.
Parcheesi game has blockades, supporting different variations concerning the way to break them.
If all the pawns are outside the jail, the values below the dice can also be used. For example, if the player gets 6-6, 1-1 can be moved also. For example, with 2 pawns he could move 7 with one pawn and 7 with another one. With 3 pawns he would move 6-1-7, respectively. With 4 he could move 6-6-1-1. Therefore, with this type of play, the player would always move 14. If all of the 14 cannot be used, the turn is forfeited.
If a player gets three consecutive doublets, he can get a pawn out of the game, as in Parqués.
After eating a pawn, it is possible to advance the score left with the same pawn (this is forbidden in Parqués)
When a player sends another player's pawn to jail, he gains 20 points that he may move with only one of his pawns.
When a pawn gets the arrival square, the player gains 10 points he can use to move a single pawn. If he cannot do it, the points are lost.

Variations by country:

Človeče nehnevaj sa: Slovakia
Člověče nezlob se: Czech Republic
Ludo: England
Mens Erger Je Niet: Netherlands
Mensch ärgere dich nicht: Germany
Non t'arrabiare: Italy
Parcheesi: USA
Parchís: Spain
Parqués: Colombia
Petits Chevaux: France

References

External links
https://web.archive.org/web/20100628045828/http://pachisi.vegard2.no/index.html: a site for games which are variations of Pachisi.
https://web.archive.org/web/20110930211718/http://pwp.etb.net.co/dokuser/eng/: website containing rules and history.

Cross and circle games
Colombian culture

de:Parqués